The St Kilda Football Club's 2008 season was its 112th season in the Australian Football League (AFL).

Summary

NAB Cup
The season began well with the club winning the preseason competition, the 2008 NAB Cup.

The club had wins over Richmond in the round of 16, Geelong in the quarter-finals, Essendon in the semi-finals and won the final against the Adelaide Crows by five points at Football Park (AAMI stadium) 2-7-9-(69) to 0-9-10-(64) - St Kilda's third preseason cup win in the AFL.  Jason Gram won the Michael Tuck medal for the player judged best on ground during the final.

Regular season
 
Despite the promising start, the Saints went on to have a mixed first half of the season with a five-win, six-loss record.  After this their fortunes vastly improved and they gained a place in the finals series.

This mixed season drew both criticism and praise at differing times towards Lyon from supporters and the media.  His game plan has been described as one championing accountability, similar to the Sydney Swans model by Paul Roos. Lyon's surprise move to drop midfielder Nick Dal Santo (as well as Stephen Milne) from the side was due to them not meeting these "benchmarks". Arguably, it was a turning point in the Saints' season, as they went on to win the next four games following this bold move.

In a very competitive 2008 premiership season St Kilda Football Club qualified for the 2008 premiership season finals series, finishing the home and away rounds in the top four, in fourth position, with 13 wins.

Finals series
In the 2008 finals series, St Kilda played Geelong in the qualifying finals. St Kilda 8.13 (61) lost to Geelong 17.17 (119) in front of 71,653 at the MCG. In the  semi finals St Kilda 17.4 (106) defeated Collingwood 9.18 (72) in front 76,707. In the preliminary finals St Kilda 9.10 (64) lost to Hawthorn 18.10 (118) by 54 points in front of 77,002 at the MCG, being eliminated from the finals. St Kilda was eliminated by Hawthorn in the preliminary final.

Fixtures

Regular season

Finals series

Ladder

External links

St Kilda Football Club Season, 2008
St Kilda Football Club seasons
St Kilda Football Club Season, 2008